The Nokia Talkman 520 is a portable phone which is discontinued.

References 

Talkman 520